Trinchesia lenkae is a species of sea slug, an aeolid nudibranch, a marine gastropod mollusc in the family Trinchesiidae.

Distribution
This species was described from Peter the Great Bay, Sea of Japan, Russia.

References

External links
  Cella, K; Carmona Barnosi, L.; Ekimova, I; Chichvarkhin, A; Schepetov, D; Gosliner, T. M. (2016). A radical solution: The phylogeny of the nudibranch family Fionidae. PLoS ONE. 11(12): e0167800
 Korshunova, T.; Martynov, A.; Picton, B. (2017). Ontogeny as an important part of integrative taxonomy in tergipedid aeolidaceans (Gastropoda: Nudibranchia) with a description of a new genus and species from the Barents Sea. Zootaxa. 4324(1): 1

Trinchesiidae
Gastropods described in 2002